Pavlia is a mountain village in the municipal unit of Trikolonoi, Arcadia, Greece. It is located at 700 m elevation on a mountain slope, overlooking the plain of Megalopoli. It is 2 km east of Palamari, 2 km west of Paliomiri, 4.5 km west of Lykochia, 9 km southeast of Stemnitsa and 14 km north of Megalopoli. The location of the ancient city Thyraion has been identified with that of the present village Pavlia. Pavlia had a population of 55 in 2011.

Population

External links
History and information about Pavlia
 Pavlia on GTP Travel Pages

See also

List of settlements in Arcadia

References

Trikolones
Populated places in Arcadia, Peloponnese